Drew Jacoby (born September 2, 1984) is an American contemporary ballet dancer. As of 2020, she is a principal dancer of Royal Ballet of Flanders.

Early life
Jacoby was born in Boise, Idaho in 1984. She trained at the School of American Ballet, the San Francisco Ballet and Pacific Northwest Ballet.

Career
In 2002, at age 17, Jacoby joined Alonzo King LINES Ballet in San Francisco, at the invitation of Alonzo King. While at the Lines Ballet, Jacoby became a principal dancer and had numerous original works created on her by King. In 2005, she joined Sylvie Guillem's Japan tour, which she danced with dancers from The Royal Ballet and Paris Opera Ballet.

In 2007 she moved to New York City to begin her freelance career, and market herself independently from a ballet company. In 2008, she formed an independent dance duo Jacoby & Pronk with Complexions Contemporary Ballet dancer Rubinald Pronk. The dual has danced with Dutch National Ballet and Morphoses/The Wheeldon Company.

Jacoby danced with Nederlands Dans Theater from 2012 to 2015. Her partnership with Pronk therefore ended. She joined the Royal Ballet of Flanders as a principal dancer in 2015, where she danced works by Pina Bausch, William Forsythe and Maurice Béjart, and worked with choreographers such as Sidi Larbi Cherkaoui and Jonah Bokaer. In 2019, Jacoby returned to the US to perform at Maria Kochetkova's solo program, Catch Her If You Can at the Joyce Theater. The program also featured works choreographed by Jacoby, danced by herself and Kochetkova.

Selected repertory 
Jacoby's repertory with the Royal Ballet of Flanders includes:
Café Müller (Pina Bausch)
Approximate Sonata (William Forsythe)
The Sleeping Beauty (Marcia Haydée after Marius Petipa): Lilac Fairy
Boléro (Maurice Béjart): Melody

Created roles
Requiem (Sidi Larbi Cherkaoui)
The Nutcracker (Demis Volpi): Cake Aunt
Shahrazad (Jonah Bokaer)
Exhibition (Larbi Cherkaoui): Lady in the Long Dress
Ma Mère l’Oye (Jeroen Verbruggen): Alma
Fall (Sidi Larbi Cherkaoui)

Film 
Jacoby has appeared in several films and videos, including the short film I Will Fall For You, directed by Sidi Larbi Cherkaoui and Woodkid. Jacoby portrayed American dancer and theatrical pioneer Loie Fuller in the 2019 film Radioactive, starring Rosamund Pike and Sam Riley.

Awards and honours 
Princess Grace Award, 2005
Dance Magazine's "It Girl", 2007

Source:

Filmography

References

External links 
 
 
 

American ballerinas
Morphoses dancers
Living people
1984 births
People from Boise, Idaho
School of American Ballet alumni
Princess Grace Awards winners
Dancers from Idaho
21st-century American dancers
American expatriates in the Netherlands
American expatriates in Belgium
21st-century American women